Tybee Island Light is a lighthouse next to the Savannah River Entrance, on the northeast end of Tybee Island, Georgia. It is one of seven surviving colonial era lighthouse towers, though highly modified in the mid 1800s.

History 
The current lighthouse is the fourth tower at this station, though neither of its first two predecessors were lit. The first tower was built at the direction of James Oglethorpe and was constructed of wood; erected in 1736, it was felled by a storm in 1741. The following year a replacement was erected, this time of stone and wood, but still without illumination; instead, it was topped with a flag pole. This tower succumbed to shoreline erosion.

The third tower was constructed in 1773 by John Mullryne, a brick tower originally  in height. It was first fitted with a system of reflectors and candles, but this was upgraded to oil lamps after it was ceded to the federal government in 1790. A second tower was added to the site in 1822 to form a range. Both towers received Fresnel lenses in 1857, with the lower front tower being equipped with a 4th order lens, while the main tower received a larger 2nd order lens.

Confederate forces burned the light in 1862 during the Civil War and removed the lens as they retreated to Fort Pulaski. Reconstruction of the light was begun in 1866 but was delayed by a cholera outbreak. This tower was equipped with a 1st order lens. The front beacon was now a  wooden skeleton tower equipped with a new 4th order lens.

The main tower was severely damaged in a hurricane in 1871, and developed such serious cracking that a $50,000 appropriation was requested for its replacement. Instead a new front tower (which had already been moved twice) was constructed of iron. New keepers dwellings were constructed in 1881 and 1885. The following year the tower was shaken by the 1886 Charleston earthquake, which damaged the lens and caused further cracking of the brickwork; these were both however immediately repaired. In 1933 the tower was electrified and the station reduced to a single keeper. The beacon was automated in 1972.

Throughout its life the daymark of the tower was modified on numerous occasions. Originally all-white, the base and lantern were painted black in 1887; this was altered in 1914 and again in 1916, each time bringing the black at the top further down the tower until the illustrated configuration was reached. In 1967 the entire tower was repainted with a white base and a gray top. The gray faded severely and was painted black in 1970.

In 1999 a major restoration project was begun under the auspices of the Tybee Island Historical Society, who took possession of the light station in 2002 under the National Historic Lighthouse Preservation Act. As part of this project the tower was repainted in the 1916–1966 black-white-black daymark. The beacon is still a functioning navigational aid, still using its original lens. The site is open to the public and retains its keepers houses and auxiliary buildings as well as the lighthouse tower.

Images

See also 
 Battle of Fort Pulaski

References

External links 
 
 Tybee Island Light Station and Museum
 
 Tybee Lighthouse historical marker

Lighthouses completed in 1736
Towers completed in 1736
Lighthouses completed in 1742
Towers completed in 1742
Lighthouses completed in 1773
Towers completed in 1773
Lighthouses completed in 1822
Lighthouses in Georgia (U.S. state)
Buildings and structures in Chatham County, Georgia
Museums in Chatham County, Georgia
1736 establishments in the Thirteen Colonies